The ancient Egyptian Bread bun hieroglyph is Gardiner sign listed no. X1 for the side view of a bread bun. It is also the simple shape of a semicircle. The hieroglyph is listed under the Gardiner category of loaves and cakes.

The bread bun hieroglyph is used in the Ancient Egyptian language hieroglyphs for the alphabetic consonant letter t. A later alternative t, is a pestle, with curved top, Gardiner U33. U33

"Bread bun/semi-circle" as feminine determiner

Besides alphabetic-t, the bread bun is used for words that are feminine, as an end qualifying determinant, often shown before other qualifying ideograms or determinants in the hieroglyphic word block-(quadrat hieroglyphic block). It is one of the most frequently used signs in hieroglyphic writing.

Palermo Stone
The t hieroglyph is used extensively throughout the Palermo Stone of the 24th to 23rd century BC, and it is used in the first row (Row I of VI), for the naming of King Tiu of Lower Egypt (a King of the North).

Palermo Stone, King Series, Row I (predynastic)

The following is the list of predynastic pharaohs (Nile Delta north) represented on the Palermo Piece of the 7–piece Palermo Stone: The sequence is in the proper order with the beginning Pharaoh on the right: (reading right-to-left, seven complete names pictured in year-registers):

Mekh, Wazner, Neheb, Thesh, Tiu (Tiu), Khayu, Hsekiu.

 .G17:F32.M13:K5.N35:U14.V13:N39..X1*M17:G43..L6:E9.S29:D28
Owl...Papyrus...Ripple......Tether...Bread&Feather.Bivalve...Cloth
Belly.....Fish......Plow........Lake.............Quail.........Newborn...Ka

Note: On the Palermo Stone all the hieroglyphs face in the other direction (Gardiner signs are only facing left; on the stone they face right (reading right-to-left)). The source of the following Pharaohs is only from this King List; a few have artifacts that further confirm their reign (the Double Falcon King). The pharaohs deficient in information are: Hsekiu, Khayu, Tiu (pharaoh), Thesh, Neheb, Wazner, Mekh.

The Egyptian hieroglyph alphabetic letters
The following two tables show the Egyptian uniliteral signs. (24 letters, but multiple use hieroglyphs)

See also
Gardiner's Sign List#X. Loaves and Cakes
List of Egyptian hieroglyphs

References

Bibliography
Schumann-Antelme, and Rossini, 1998. Illustrated Hieroglyphics Handbook, Ruth Schumann-Antelme, and Stéphane Rossini. c 1998, English trans. 2002, Sterling Publishing Co. (Index, Summary lists (tables), selected uniliterals, biliterals, and triliterals.) (softcover)

Egyptian hieroglyphs: alphabet-vulture-a-to-cobra-dj
Egyptian hieroglyphs: loaves and cakes